Solaris (also known as Solaris the Tyrant Sun) is a DC Comics supervillain who exists in the distant future of the DC Universe. Solaris was created by Grant Morrison, and first appeared in the DC One Million crossover, although it also subsequently appeared in Grant Morrison's All-Star Superman series, set outside DC continuity.

Fictional character biography

DC One Million
In the 853rd century Solaris is a secondary artificial sun, a sentient machine in the orbit of Uranus that helps to warm the outer parts of the Solar System and relay communications and information. His caretaker is the future Starman.

Solaris was created in the 20th century section of the DC One Million storyline in an apparent predestination paradox, as his abilities were required to counteract an organic computer virus his 853rd century self had sent back, concealed in the android Hourman. Unbeknownst to those constructing him, Solaris' core programming was contained in the computer virus, resulting in the tyrant sun's creation being the result of a time loop, although he was swiftly defeated and banished to the outskirts of the galaxy by the Starman of the 853rd century before he could organise himself enough to take offensive action after his creation.

All-Star Superman
According to the future timeline established in DC One Million, after Solaris was originally created in the late 20th century, he will fight many battles against "the progenitor of the dynasty" (a.k.a. the original Superman) between that time and the departure of the original Superman from Earth at the end of the 21st century. As yet, no such battles have been published. Solaris is still technically at large within the DC universe.

Morrison used the character in his out-of-continuity All-Star Superman series, which began in 2005 and concluded in 2008. Solaris was referenced in issue #2 of that series, in the form of a report from Kal Kent, the Superman of the 853rd century. The report was viewed via Superman's prototype Time Telescope. Kal Kent appeared identical to his appearance in DC One Million. The Tyrant Sun appears as a distinct character in issue #11, where Superman reveals that he knows that Solaris will continue to exist into the distant future, again similar to the events in DC One Million.

The future
After that point, Solaris will be a recurrent villain plaguing Superman's descendants, until he is considered the greatest enemy of the Superman dynasty. This will continue until the 505th century Superman sacrifices his life in order to reprogram the artificial sun. At that point, Solaris will recant its villainous ways and work for the betterment of humanity, becoming an ally of the Superman dynasty.

At that time Solaris is never able to rise to the high standard set by the Supermen, and also part of his service never seems entirely altruistic. These suspicions will gradually be confirmed as Solaris rises to lead a group called the Pancosmic Justice Jihad, which will take advantage of the paranoia of a dark age to justify an aggressive agenda of preemptive strikes and be venerated by the fearful population. The return of Superman Prime (Kal-El, the original Superman) from his long wandering at the boundaries of existence in the 701st century will trigger a great spiritual revival, during which humanity will look to develop its own ultimate mental potential and turn its back on artificial computers (cf. Frank Herbert's Butlerian Jihad), including Solaris.

Solaris will then be relegated to the role he occupies at the dawn of the 853rd century, that of the secondary sun of Earth's solar system, forever considered inferior to the yellow primary Sun which serves as Superman's current Fortress of Solitude. The resentment that festers in Solaris as a result of this situation will lead him to plot with the 853rd century Starman and the immortal Vandal Savage to destroy Superman Prime upon his return from his 15,270 year stay in the heart of the sun. Their intention was to trap and kill the original Justice League—Superman's oldest friends—in a world they could not comprehend, and subsequently Solaris would replace the Sun after the original Superman was assassinated using the last known piece of Kryptonite in the universe. However, this plan was thwarted by the Justice League back in the past (consisting of Steel, Plastic Man, Big Barda, Huntress and Zauriel), who destroyed the Kryptonite fragment and secretly replaced it with a Green Lantern power ring, while in the 853rd century Kyle Rayner triggered a supernova in the core of Solaris and then contained it using his own power ring. Solaris was subsequently crushed by Superman Prime upon his emergence from the Sun using his newly-acquired Green Lantern ring.

Future State
Solaris reappears during the DC event "Future State" as an enemy of Superman and Wonder Woman in a possible future timeline.

In other media
 Solaris appears in All-Star Superman, voiced by Robin Atkin Downes.

Reception
Solaris was praised as one of those major storyline villains that didn't need to be tied to the story that introduced them and reused often unlike Bane or Doomsday.

References

DC Comics aliens
DC Comics extraterrestrial supervillains
DC Comics robots
DC Comics supervillains
Characters created by Grant Morrison
Comics characters introduced in 1998
Fictional computer viruses
Fictional viruses